Charles Kleiber (b. 9 December 1942 in Moutier) is a former Swiss state secretary.

Educated as an architect at EPFL (1968), he worked as a consultant in hospital architecture during the 1970s.
In 1981, he became director of the public health department of the canton Vaud. 
He submitted a PhD thesis on the topic of the impact of economic incentives on performance in medical care in 1991 at the University of Lausanne (published as Questions des soins with Payot, Lausanne, 1991).
Kleiber was appointed  director general of the university hospitals of Lausanne in 1992.

In 1997, he became State Secretary for Education and Research, at the time part of the Federal Department of Home Affairs, where he remained until his retirement in 2007.
He opted to sign the Bologna declaration for Switzerland, against the resistance of the Swiss university rectors, initiating the controversial Bologna Process of university reforms.

References

Pierre-Yves Donzé, Kleiber, Charles (1942-), Dictionnaire du Jura (2005, 2007)

External links
biography  at  International Risk Governance Council (IRGC)

Swiss civil servants
Swiss architects
Federal Department of Home Affairs
1942 births
Living people